Hasan Al-Shammari (born 21 February 1967) is a Kuwaiti swimmer. He competed in two events at the 1988 Summer Olympics.

References

External links
 

1967 births
Living people
Kuwaiti male swimmers
Olympic swimmers of Kuwait
Swimmers at the 1988 Summer Olympics
Place of birth missing (living people)